Susan Buthaina Sinnott is professor and head of materials science and engineering at Pennsylvania State University. Sinnott is a fellow of the Materials Research Society (MRS), the American Association for the Advancement of Science (AAAS) and the American Physical Society (APS). She has served as editor-in-chief of the journal Computational Materials Science since 2014.

Early life and education 
Sinnott received a bachelors of science in chemistry at the University of Texas at Austin. She moved to Iowa State University for her graduate studies, and earned her doctoral degree in physical chemistry in 1993.

Research and career 
After graduating Sinnott moved to the United States Naval Research Laboratory where she worked on surface chemistry.
 After two years at the Naval Research Laboratory, Sinnott was appointed an assistant professor at the University of Kentucky. In 2000 she was recruited to the University of Florida as an Associate Professor. Sinnott was promoted to Professor at the University of Florida in 2005, where she led projects on cyber infrastructure and quantum theory. In 2015 Sinnott was appointed Head of Materials Science and Engineering at the Pennsylvania State University.

Sinnott's research involves the development of computational methods to understand the electronic and atomic structure of materials. Her computational models include continuum level modelling and fluid dynamics and take into account material behaviour at the nanoscale. She has investigated the formation and role of grain boundaries, dopants, defects and heterogeneous interfaces. Her research has considered perovskites, showing that the alignment or tilting of the perovskite oxygen cages impacts the materials properties. Sinnott has served as editor-in-chief of the scientific journal Computational Materials Science since 2014.

Her principal research interests at Penn State University include two-dimensional and nano-structured materials, gas adsorption and separation in porous solid materials, and condensed matter physics.

Selected awards and honours 
Her awards include:
 2005 Elected a fellow of the American Vacuum Society
 2009 Distinguished editor of the Physical Review Letters
 2010 Elected a fellow of the American Association for the Advancement of Science
 2011 Elected a fellow of the American Ceramic Society
 2012 Elected a fellow of the Materials Research Society
 2013 Elected a fellow of the American Physical Society
 2013 Top 25 Women Professors in Florida

Selected publications 
Her publications include
 A second-generation reactive empirical bond order (REBO) potential energy expression for hydrocarbons
 Model of carbon nanotube growth through chemical vapor deposition
 Carbon nanotubes: synthesis, properties, and applications
 Effect of chemical functionalization on the mechanical properties of carbon nanotubes

References 

University of Texas at Austin alumni
Pennsylvania State University faculty
Women materials scientists and engineers
American materials scientists
Iowa State University alumni
University of Kentucky faculty
University of Florida faculty
Fellows of the American Association for the Advancement of Science
Fellows of the American Physical Society
Year of birth missing (living people)
Living people